Rashad Capone Weaver (born November 10, 1997) is an American football outside linebacker for the Tennessee Titans of the National Football League (NFL). He played college football at Pittsburgh.

Early years
Weaver was one of three children born to Autumn DeLaPorte and Nevin Weaver. He has two sisters. Weaver attended Cooper City High School in Cooper City, Florida. He played defensive end and tight end in high school. He originally committed to the University of Michigan to play college football but changed his commitment to the University of Pittsburgh.

College career
After redshirting his first year at Pittsburgh in 2016, Weaver played in 12 games and made five starts in 2017. He finished the season with 28 tackles and three sacks. He started all 14 games in 2018, recording 47 tackles and a team-leading 6.5 sacks. Weaver missed the 2019 season after tearing his ACL. He returned from the injury for his senior season in 2020. While at Pittsburgh, Weaver earned a bachelor's degree with a dual major in Business Information Systems (BBIS) and finance. He went on to attend Pittsburgh's Graduate School of Business.

Professional career

Weaver was drafted by the Tennessee Titans in the fourth round, 135th overall, of the 2021 NFL Draft. He signed his four-year rookie contract with Tennessee on June 10, 2021. He was placed on injured reserve on September 28, 2021.

References

External links
Tennessee Titans bio
Pittsburgh Panthers bio

1997 births
Living people
Players of American football from Florida
American football defensive ends
Pittsburgh Panthers football players
All-American college football players
Tennessee Titans players
Sportspeople from Broward County, Florida
People from Cooper City, Florida